This page lists solids derived from a sphere.

Solids from cutting a sphere with one or more planes
 Dome
 Spherical cap
 Spherical sector
 Spherical segment
 Spherical shell
 Spherical wedge

Solids from deforming a sphere
 Ellipsoid
 Spheroid
 Solid bounded by Morin surface
 Any Genus 0 surface

Solids from intersecting a sphere with other solids or curved planes
 Reuleaux tetrahedron
 Spherical lens

Notes

Geometric shapes
Mathematics-related lists